The Broken Horseshoe may refer to:
The Broken Horseshoe (film), 1953 British crime film
The Broken Horseshoe (TV series), 1952 British TV series